The 2020 African Badminton Championships (officially known as All Africa Individual Championships 2020) is the continental badminton championships to crown the best players across Africa. The tournament is being held at the Cairo Stadium Hall 2 in Cairo, Egypt, from 14 to 16 February 2020.

Medalists

Medal table

Tournament 
The 2020 African Badminton Championships is a continental tournament to crown the best players in Africa.

Venue 
This tournament was held at the Cairo Stadium Hall 2 in Cairo, Egypt.

Point distribution
The individual event of this tournament is graded based on the BWF points system for the BWF International Challenge event. Below is the table with the point distribution for each phase of the tournament.

Men's singles

Seeds

 Georges Paul (champion)
 Anuoluwapo Juwon Opeyori (final)
 Godwin Olofua (semifinals)
 Adham Hatem Elgamal (semifinals)
 Ahmed Salah (third round)
 Youcef Sabri Medel (quarterfinals)
 Melvin Appiah (second round)
 Aatish Lubah (quarterfinals)

Finals

Top half

Section 1

Section 2

Bottom half

Section 3

Section 4

Women's singles

Seeds

 Dorcas Ajoke Adesokan (final)
 Doha Hany (semifinals)
 Kate Foo Kune (champion)
 Hadia Hosny (semifinals)

Finals

Top half

Section 1

Section 2

Bottom half

Section 3

Section 4

Men's doubles

Seeds

 Godwin Olofua / Anuoluwapo Juwon Opeyori (semifinals)
 Koceila Mammeri / Youcef Sabri Medel (champions)
 Adham Hatem Elgamal / Ahmed Salah (quarterfinals)
 Enejoh Abah / Isaac Minaphee (semifinals)

Finals

Top half

Section 1

Section 2

Bottom half

Section 3

Section 4

Women's doubles

Seeds

 Doha Hany / Hadia Hosny (champions)
 Dorcas Ajoke Adesokan / Uchechukwu Deborah Ukeh (final)

Finals

Top half

Section 1

Section 2

Bottom half

Section 3

Section 4

Mixed doubles

Seeds

 Adham Hatem Elgamal / Doha Hany (champions) 
 Ahmed Salah / Hadia Hosny (semifinals)
 Koceila Mammeri / Linda Mazri
 Tejraj Pultoo / Kobita Dookhee (semifinals)

Finals

Top half

Section 1

Section 2

Bottom half

Section 3

Section 4

References

External links 
 Tournament Link

African Badminton Championships
African Badminton Championships
African Badminton Championships
African Badminton Championships
African Badminton Championships
Badminton tournaments in Egypt